Introduction, Presence is the debut studio album by American synth-pop band, Nation of Language. The self-released album was scheduled for release on April 3, 2020, but was postponed to May 22, 2020 due to the COVID-19 pandemic.

Critical reception 

Introduction, Presence was critically acclaimed by contemporary music critics upon release. On review aggregator website, Metacritic, Introduction, Presence has an average critic score of 81 out of 100, indicating "universal acclaim" based on four critics. On Album of the Year, Introduction, Presence has an average score of 80 out of 100 based on five critics.

Track listing

References

External links 

2020 debut albums
Nation of Language albums
Self-released albums
Albums postponed due to the COVID-19 pandemic